The Dark Side of Chocolate is a 2010 documentary film about the exploitation and slavetrading of African children to harvest chocolate still occurring nearly ten years after the cocoa industry pledged to end it.

Background
Cocoa plantations in Ghana and the Ivory Coast provide 80% of the world with chocolate, according to CorpWatch. Chocolate producers around the world have been pressured to “verify that their chocolate is not the product of child labor or slavery.”

In 2000, BBC aired Slavery: A Global Investigation which brought the issue of child labor in the cocoa industry to light.

In 2001, the Chocolate Manufacturers Association and its members signed a document that prohibited child trafficking and labor in the cocoa industry after 2008. Despite this effort, numerous children are still forced to work on cocoa plantations in Africa.

In 2009, Mars and Cadbury joined the Rainforest Alliance to fight against child labor. By 2020, these major chocolate manufacturers hoped to completely eradicate child labor on any plantations from which they purchase their cocoa. As of 2019, there are still 1.56 million child laborers in Ghana and the Ivory Coast.

Production
The Dark Side of Chocolate was directed by Danish journalist, lawyer and writer Miki Mistrati who investigated the use of child labor and trafficked children in chocolate production. It was filmed by U. Roberto Romano and produced by Helle Faber.

The filming started in Germany, where Mistrati asked vendors where their chocolate comes from. They then flew to Mali, where many of the children are from. Next, they explored the Ivory Coast, Ghana and Nigeria where the cocoa plantations are located. The film ends in Switzerland where both the International Labour Organization (ILO) and the Nestle headquarters are located.

Much of the footage in this documentary is recorded using a secret camera, but some of the material was deleted by the authorities.

The documentary was released in 2010, first in Denmark, and later in Sweden, Ireland, Belgium, and Norway.

Synopsis
In 2001, the Chocolate Manufacturers Association formed an action plan entitled the Harkin-Engel Protocol, an agreement that was signed by the major chocolate companies almost 10 years before the film was made, aimed at ending child trafficking and slave labor in the cocoa industry.

The documentary starts in Cologne, Germany where Mistrati asks several chocolate company representatives whether they are aware of child labour in cocoa farms. In Mali, the film shows that children, having been promised paid work, are taken to towns near the border such as Zegoua, from where another trafficker transports the children over the border on a dirt-bike. Then they are left with a third trafficker who sells the children to farmers for a starting price of 230 Euros each.

The children, ranging in age from 10 to 15, are forced to do hard and often hazardous labor, are often beaten, and according to the film's narrator most are never paid. The narrator also claims that most of them stay with the plantation until they die, never seeing their families again. No documentary evidence is shown to support the claims that the children are not paid or that they are made to work until they die. The Harkin-Engel Protocol promised to end the use of child labour.

When confronted with this issue, corporate representatives denied all rumors of child labor and trafficking, but the investigations of the filmmakers brought to light the continued widespread use of trafficked child slaves on cocoa plantations.

Nestlé and other companies declined an invitation to watch the film and to answer questions. In response, Mistrati set up a large screen next to Nestlé’s headquarters in Switzerland, forcing employees to catch a glimpse of child labor in the cocoa industry.

As a closing edit window to the film, during the credits roll, we see the local police arrive, to ask why they are showing the film outside Nestlé's Head Office in Vevey, Switzerland.  The police ask if the film is 'for or against Nestlé'. The reply is "It is not against". After checking their documents the policeman says "we turn it off", referring to showing the film.

Reception
In 2012, The Dark Side of Chocolate was nominated for the Adolf Grimme Award in the category of Information & Culture.

Personnel

 Creators: Miki Mistrati, U. Roberto Romano
 Producer: Helle Faber
 Journalist: Svante Karlshoej Ipsen
 Script: Miki Mistrati
 Editor: Andreas Birch Eriksen
 Research: Ditte Nielsen, Svante Karlshoej Ipsen, Miki Mistrati, U. Roberto Romano, Youchaou * Traor, Assoumane Maiga
 Photographers: Henrik Bohn Ipsen, U. Roberto Romano, Niels Thastum
 Assistant Photographer: Miki Mistrati
 Color Grade: Andreas Birch Eriksen
 Sound: Bobby Hess, Asser Borgen
 Sound Assistant: Ingeborg Holten
 Composer: Jonas Colstrup
 Graphics: Benny Box
 Narrator: David Bateson
 Production Managers: Mathilde Hvid Lippmann, Joel Norup Soegaard
 Production Assistants: Markus Ramlau, Helene Juncher Jensen, Rasmus Odgaard
 Technical Assistance: Jonas Abildgaard
 Translations: Helene Juncher Jensen, Tolkegruppen Koebenhavn (Prestige Network Ltd)
 Webdesign: Kalle Graverholt
 Associates: Osange Silou-Kieffer, Bernard Kieffer, Fabian Abitbol, ProShop Europe
 Partners: Mette Hoffmann (DR2) & Barbara Biemann (NDR)
 Support From: Danida, Media, Monique Dobretz (TSR), Axel Arno (SVT), Arto Hyvonen (YLE), ERR Jaspreet Singh Syan

References

External links
 
 

2010 films
2010 documentary films
Cocoa production
Danish documentary films
Documentary films about agriculture
Documentary films about child abuse
Documentary films about slavery
Slavery in the chocolate industry
2010s English-language films